Turkana North Constituency is an electoral constituency in Kenya. It is one of six constituencies in Turkana County. The constituency was established for the 1997 elections. The constituency has 18 wards, all electing councillors to the Turkana County Council.

Members of Parliament

Wards

References 

Constituencies in Rift Valley Province
Constituencies in Turkana County
1997 establishments in Kenya
Constituencies established in 1997